Cuttanee (also called cotonis, cuttance, or cutance) was a fine heavy and stout silk and cotton satin of East India, formerly produced for export, with bright coloured woven stripes and sometimes floral designs, used for quilts and upholstery.  It was a product of Gujarat in the 17th and 18th centuries.

References 

Woven fabrics
Satin